Call of Duty 4: Modern Warfare is a 2007 first-person shooter video game developed by Infinity Ward and published by Activision. It is the fourth main installment in the Call of Duty series. The game breaks away from the World War II setting of previous entries and is instead set in modern times. Developed for over two years, Modern Warfare was released in November 2007 for the PlayStation 3, Xbox 360 and Microsoft Windows, and was ported to the Wii as Call of Duty: Modern Warfare – Reflex Edition in 2009.

The story takes place in the year of 2011, where a radical leader has executed the president of an unnamed country in the Middle East, and an ultranationalist movement ignites a civil war in Russia. The conflicts are seen from the perspectives of a U.S. Marine Force Recon sergeant and a British SAS commando and are set in various locales, such as the United Kingdom, the Middle East, Azerbaijan, Russia, and Ukraine. The multiplayer portion of the game features various game modes and contains a leveling system that allows the player to unlock additional weapons, weapon attachments, and camouflage schemes as they advance.

The game received universal acclaim from critics, with praise towards the gameplay and story, but criticism for the lack of innovation. The game won numerous awards from gaming websites, including IGN "Best Xbox 360 Game". The game is considered one of the greatest video games of all time. It was the top-selling game worldwide for 2007, selling around sevenmillion copies by January 2008 and almost sixteenmillion by November 2013. It was followed by two sequels that continue the storyline: Call of Duty: Modern Warfare 2 (2009) and Call of Duty: Modern Warfare 3 (2011).

A remastered version of the game, Call of Duty: Modern Warfare Remastered, was released as part of special edition bundles of Call of Duty: Infinite Warfare in November 2016, and as a standalone game in June 2017. A reboot of the Modern Warfare games, Call of Duty: Modern Warfare, was released in October 2019.

Gameplay
Call of Duty 4: Modern Warfare is a first-person shooter. A character can be positioned in one of three stances: standing, crouching, or prone, each affecting the character's rate of movement, accuracy, and stealth. Using cover helps the player avoid enemy fire or recover health after taking significant damage. As such, there are no armor or health power-ups. When the character has taken damage, the edges of the screen glow red and the character's heartbeat increases. If the character stays out of fire, the character can recover. When the character is within the blast radius of a live grenade, a marker indicates the direction of the grenade, helping the player to either flee or toss it back to the enemy.

The game is the first in the Call of Duty series to feature modern equipment. The game also introduces new features, particularly multiplayer mechanics such as "killstreaks" where the player gains access to special abilities for killing enemies without dying.

Campaign
The player takes on the role of various characters during a single-player campaign. The characters' involvement in the plot occurs simultaneously and overlaps the events in the game. As such, the player's perspective changes from one character to another between missions. Each mission features a series of objectives; the player is led to each objective with the heads up display, which marks its direction and distance. Some objectives require that the player arrives at a checkpoint, while other objectives require the player to eliminate enemies in a specified location, stand their ground to defend an objective, or plant explosive charges on an enemy installation. After completing the campaign, a special epilogue mission is unlocked for play. The mission itself has no bearing on the campaign plot, and focuses on an SAS squad fighting terrorists that have hijacked an airplane and taken a VIP hostage. The main campaign features 30 collectible pieces of intel that award the player with game cheats and visual filters such as infinite ammunition, cluster grenades, and increased contrast.

Multiplayer

Call of Duty 4: Modern Warfare features team-based and deathmatch-based multiplayer modes on various maps. Each mode has an objective that requires unique strategies to complete. Players can call in UAV reconnaissance scans, airstrikes, and attack helicopters, when they achieve three-, five-, and seven-enemy kill streaks respectively. A game ends when either a team or player has reached a predefined number of points, or the allotted time expires in which case the team or player with the most points wins. If the points are even when the time expires, Sudden Death mode is activated in which there is no re-spawning and the team who either has the last man standing, or achieves the objective first are the winners. If the player is in either of the two matches, then there is an Overtime match, in which the next team to win is rewarded the victory.

The player's performance in the multiplayer mode is tracked with experience points, which can be earned by killing opposing players, completing challenges, completing objectives, or by completing a round or match. As the player gains experience, they advance in level, unlocking new weapons, perks, challenges, and gameplay modes. The highest obtainable level is 55, but on the console versions of the game, the player has the option to enter "Prestige" mode, which returns their level to one and removes all accumulated unlockables. This process can be repeated up to 10 times with a different insignia being given each time.

As the player advances in levels and goes up higher in prestige, they earn the ability to customize their classes; this includes selecting their main weapon, sidearm and special grenade type. Additionally, the player can select 3 perks, one from each of the three "Tiers", that can customize their character further. Perk effects include, but are not limited to, extra ammunition, increasing bullet damage by the player, or dropping a live grenade when the player is killed. The player is also given the choice to complete challenges in order to receive even more experience points; challenges include achieving a certain number of kills with a specific weapon, shooting down a helicopter or performing a number of headshots. Additionally, when the player attains a certain number of headshots with a specific weapon, excluding sidearms, the player unlocks extra weapon "camos", or camouflage, to use for that specific weapon.

Campaign

Characters
During the single-player campaign, the player controls six different characters from a first-person perspective. The player assumes the role of recent recruit to the British Special Air Service (SAS), Sergeant John "Soap" MacTavish for most of the game, starting with his induction into the 22nd SAS Regiment. Sergeant Paul Jackson is a member of the U.S. Marine Corps 1st Force Recon Company deployed to the Middle East, who the player controls during five levels of Act 1. Captain John Price (voiced by actor Billy Murray) is an SAS officer who is playable in two flashback missions from 1996 in which he is a Lieutenant. The player also assumes the role of an American thermal-imaging TV operator aboard a Lockheed AC-130 gunship during one level, and a British SAS operative infiltrating a hijacked airliner to save a VIP in a secret level titled "Mile High Club". Finally, the player may control Yasir Al-Fulani, the president of an unnamed Middle Eastern country in the game before he is executed, although he has no freedom of action beyond turning his head.

The game's non-playable characters (NPCs) feature prominently in the story: Captain Price and his right-hand man, Gaz (voiced by Craig Fairbrass), serve as mentors to Soap. Jackson's platoon is led by Lieutenant Vasquez (voiced by David Sobolov) and Staff Sergeant Griggs (voiced by and modeled after Infinity Ward lead animator Mark Grigsby); Griggs later accompanies Soap in Russia. Sergeant Kamarov (voiced by Mark Ivanir) leads the Russian loyalists that aid the SAS and USMC forces. "Nikolai" (voiced by Sven Holmberg) is a Russian informant who helps the SAS. Captain MacMillan (voiced by Zach Hanks) is Price's mentor and commanding officer during a flashback.

The antagonists in the story include Imran Zakhaev (voiced by Yevgeni Lazarev), the leader of the Russian ultranationalist party and the main antagonist of the game; Khaled Al-Asad, the commander of the revolutionary forces in the Middle East and an ally of Imran Zakhaev; and Victor Zakhaev, the son of Imran Zakhaev and a priority figure in the ultranationalist party.

Plot

In 2011, a civil war breaks out in Russia between its government and Ultranationalists. Meanwhile, a separatist group led by Khaled Al-Asad, who holds anti-Western views, seizes power in an unnamed country in the Middle East through a coup d'état. In response, the United States invades the country. A platoon of U.S. Marines from 1st Force Recon Co, led by Lieutenant Vasquez, fail to capture Al-Asad and later engage in urban combat in a nearby city with support from an M1 Abrams tank.

Meanwhile, new British Special Air Service operator Sergeant John "Soap" MacTavish is recruited into Captain Price's team, which conducts two operations; the first leads them to infiltrate a cargo ship in the Bering Strait. Neutralizing the armed Russians on board, the team secure a nuclear device labeled in Arabic. Enemy MiGs scuttle the ship, but the SAS escapes by helicopter.

The second operation tasks the SAS with rescuing an ally, a Russian informant named Nikolai working within the Ultranationalist party. Assisted by Russian loyalist forces, Price's team extracts Nikolai. However, their helicopter is brought down, forcing the team to make their way through enemy territory with support from an AC-130 gunship before they are extracted. Intelligence gathered from these two missions indicates that Al-Asad may be in possession of a Russian nuclear device.

The U.S. launches a full-scale assault on Al-Asad's presidential palace, aware of the possible nuclear device. As SEAL Team 6 raids the palace, the USMC engage Al-Asad's ground forces. However, the assault ends in catastrophe when the nuclear device suddenly detonates, wiping out most of the city along with everyone in it.

Refusing to assume Al-Asad dead, Price's team supported by Russian loyalists raids a safe house in Azerbaijan where they locate and capture Al-Asad. During the interrogation, Price answers Al-Asad's phone before executing him, revealing that the caller was the leader of the ultranationalists: Imran Zakhaev. Price reveals that in the aftermath of the Chernobyl disaster and the collapse of the Soviet Union, Zakhaev profited from nuclear proliferation and used his new wealth to lure Soviet Army soldiers to form his ultranationalist party. Price and his superior Captain MacMillan were ordered to assassinate Zakhaev in Pripyat, Ukraine in 1996, where Price fired upon Zakhaev with a sniper rifle from a hotel; however, the shot only severed Zakhaev's arm. Price and MacMillan barely escaped Zakhaev's forces.

Following Al-Asad's death, Price's team hold off against Ultranationalist forces who arrive to avenge him. A joint task force composed of the SAS, Force Recon, and the loyalists then attempt to capture Zakhaev's son, Victor, to learn Zakhaev's whereabouts. After ambushing him, Victor flees but is cornered on the roof of an apartment building. Refusing to surrender, he commits suicide. Enraged, Zakhaev retaliates by taking control of a nuclear launch facility.

An operation is launched by the task force to take back the site. However, Zakhaev promptly launches nuclear intercontinental ballistic missiles at the U.S. Eastern Seaboard, with the potential of causing 41 million casualties. The SAS and Force Recon manage to breach the facility and remotely destroy the missiles over the Atlantic Ocean. They escape in military trucks with Zakhaev's forces in pursuit.

An ultranationalist Mi-24 Hind helicopter destroys a bridge and traps the joint force. In the ensuing fight, a tanker explodes, and many of the group are either killed or injured. Zakhaev himself arrives and begins killing wounded soldiers when arriving loyalists in a Mi-28 Havoc destroy his Mi-24 Hind. Distracted, Zakhaev turns to the loyalists and Price gives a pistol to Soap, who kills Zakhaev and his escort. Loyalist forces start tending to the wounded immediately.

In the epilogue, the missile incident and the ultranationalists' support of Al-Asad are covered up, prompting further events.

Development
Call of Duty 4: Modern Warfare was developed by a team of a hundred people, over the course of two years. After Call of Duty 2, the Infinity Ward team decided to move away from the World War II environment of previous games in the series. This resulted in three game concepts: Call of Duty 4: Modern Warfare, Call of Duty: Modern Warfare 2 and Call of Duty: Modern Warfare 3. While developing the story for Call of Duty 4, Infinity Ward chose to avoid referencing current, real-life wars, and keep the series' common theme of two opposing forces of similar strength. To enhance the realistic feel of the game, the development team attended a live-fire exercise at Marine Corps Air Ground Combat Center Twentynine Palms, a training facility in the California desert. This helped the developers to simulate the effects of being near an Abrams tank when it fires. The team also talked with U.S. Marines who were recently in combat to get a feel for the background, emotions, and attitude of Marines in combat. Veterans were also recruited to supervise motion capture sessions and the artificial intelligence design of the game.

The development team designed the online multiplayer component to be balanced and rewarding for new players while still offering something for experienced players. An early idea to implement air support (air strikes and attack helicopters) involved players fighting over special zones to access a trigger for air support against enemies. This idea was discarded because it discouraged the type of deathmatch gameplay they intended. The killstreak reward system was put in its place to encourage the improvement of player skills. Players were allowed to select weapons before matches to get accustomed to weapons more easily and minimize weapon hunting. Maps were designed primarily for deathmatch games—the developers felt such designs suited other types of gameplay as well. Map layouts were designed to minimize locations players could hide from enemy gunfire.

Most of the music for Call of Duty 4: Modern Warfare was written by British composer Stephen Barton, who had also contributed to film scores by Harry Gregson-Williams, to whom, composed the main theme of the game. Several music tracks from the game are available on Infinity Ward's "7 Days of Modern Warfare" website, and some are available at Barton's own web site. The rap song played during the end credits is performed by Call of Duty 4's lead animator, Mark Grigsby.

Game engine

Call of Duty 4: Modern Warfare runs on the IW engine, specifically IW 3.0, featuring true world-dynamic lighting, HDR lighting effects, dynamic shadows and depth of field. Bullet penetration is calculated by the engine, taking into account factors such as surface type and entity thickness. The game runs in a native resolution of 600p on the Xbox 360 and PS3.

Certain objects, such as cars and some buildings, are destructible. This makes distinguishing cover from concealment important, as the protection provided by objects such as wooden fences and thin walls do not completely protect players from harm. Bullet stopping power is decreased after penetrating an object, and the decrease is dependent on the thickness and surface type of the object. The game makes use of a dynamic physics engine, not implemented in previous Call of Duty titles. Death animations are a combination of pre-set animations and ragdoll physics. Console versions of Call of Duty 4: Modern Warfare run at a consistent 60 frames per second, and the Wii version runs at 30 frames per second. Code was included to determine spawning points based on the nearby weapons and the relationship between enemy positions and line of sight to the points. The various criteria are meant to minimize players dying immediately after rejoining a match, or being "spawn-killed" due to players simply waiting for others to "respawn". However, enemies may still respawn infinitely, a notable feature in Call of Duty game engines.

The game engine has also been used for the development of two other Activision games. An enhanced version of the original engine was used in Call of Duty: World at War, the fifth installment in the Call of Duty series after Call of Duty 4: Modern Warfare, while a slightly altered version has been used for the James Bond video game Quantum of Solace, as well as GoldenEye 007 using a heavily modified version.

Marketing and release
On April 27, 2007, the day before the release of the game's trailer, Infinity Ward launched a website called "Charlie Oscar Delta" to provide information on the game. Charlie Oscar Delta features a ranking system that allows users to complete missions to increase their rank and compete for prizes. Charlie Oscar Delta is derived from the NATO phonetic alphabet and the initials of Call of Duty. The first Call of Duty 4: Modern Warfare trailer featuring game footage was released on April 28. An Xbox 360 Call of Duty 4: Modern Warfare public beta test was announced on August 30. The beta test was designed to test the servers, find glitches, and help balance out the weapons. It was originally only for residents of the U.S., but was later available to other countries. The beta concluded on September 30. The maximum rank for the beta was initially level 16, but was increased to level 25 towards the end of the beta. Three multiplayer maps were available for play: "Crash", "Vacant", and "Overgrown". A single-player demo for the PC was released on October 11 as a Yahoo! download. The demo includes one level, "The Bog", which showcases the advanced night vision and associated graphics capabilities.

Retail versions
The game was released as a standard version and a collector's edition. The Collector's Edition contains the standard retail game and a DVD containing a documentary film entitled "Great SAS Missions", which consists of archive footage of the SAS in action and accounts from former SAS members. The DVD contains a "making-of" featurette and a level walkthrough by the developers. Also included is a limited edition poster and a hardcover art book featuring never-before-seen concept, development, and final artwork. These elements were packaged in a larger cardboard version of the standard retail box. The collector's edition was originally only available in the U.S., but was later released in other countries. A "Game of the Year" edition was later released on PC, Xbox 360, and PlayStation 3. The PlayStation 3 version included the Variety map pack on the disc, and while the Xbox 360 Game of the Year edition initially included an insert in the packaging which could be redeemed on Xbox Live Marketplace to download the Variety map pack, later releases did not contain the inserts, and so were no different from the original release of the game.

Call of Duty 4: Modern Warfare was released for consoles and Windows in North America on November 5, 2007, in Australia on November 7, 2007, and in Europe on November 9, 2007. The Mac OS X version of the game was developed by Aspyr and released on September 26, 2008. It was released on the Mac App Store on January 16, 2011. It was rated 15 by the BBFC, M for Mature by the ESRB, MA 15+ by the OFLC, 16+ by the PEGI, and 18 by the USK. The Wii port of the game, titled Call of Duty: Modern Warfare – Reflex Edition, was developed by Treyarch and released on November 10, 2009, alongside Call of Duty: Modern Warfare 2 and Call of Duty: Modern Warfare: Mobilized.

Downloadable content
As part of an exclusivity deal between Microsoft and Activision, multiplayer map packs for the Call of Duty franchise, beginning with Modern Warfare, were released first on Xbox 360. The deal would ultimately last until Black Ops III in 2015, which introduces a new deal with Sony and PlayStation platforms.

Infinity Ward released the Variety Map Pack for the Xbox 360 on April 4, 2008. It includes the multiplayer maps "Killhouse", "Creek", "Chinatown", and "Broadcast". The same map pack was released for the PlayStation 3 on April 24, 2008. The Variety Map Pack was downloaded by over one million people in its first nine days of release, a record for paid Xbox Live downloadable content, valued at US$10 million. It was released as a free download for Windows on June 5, 2008, sponsored by Nvidia, along with patch 1.6. A further patch for the PlayStation 3 and Xbox 360 versions of the game was announced over a year later in August 2009; the patch primarily addressed online multiplayer exploits. Patch 1.7 was released in June 2008. This patch can be applied to the Game of the Year edition directly with no prior patches. Earlier versions must have patch 1.6 applied first.

Reception

Critical response
Call of Duty 4: Modern Warfare received "universal acclaim" on the PlayStation 3, Xbox 360, and PC versions, and "generally favorable reviews" for the Wii version, according to review aggregator Metacritic. The gameplay has been cited by reviewers to have brought the genre to "a new level of immersion and intensity that we had never seen before." GameSpot gave a favorable review for Call of Duty 4: Modern Warfare, saying that the "high quality of that campaign and its terrific multiplayer options make Call of Duty 4 a fantastic package." Official Xbox Magazine praised the single player campaign, with even greater praise for the multiplayer mode which makes the game an "instant-classic". X-Play commented that "It may not revolutionize the shooter genre, but it comes damn close to perfecting it." GamePro claims that "the amazingly deep multiplayer rivals Halo 3 in terms of reach and scope."

The game's story has received a considerable amount of acclaim from reviewers. GamePro notes that "the intense single-player campaign offers up an action packed experience that features a tremendously compelling narrative; there are moments in the game that will send chills down your spine." GameSpot mentioned that the fact the "single-player campaign is over in a flash" as the only major flaw. While IGN described the campaign as "still very linear" like that of its predecessors, "eschewing the concept of sandbox gameplay", it noted that this resulted in "a much richer, more focused experience" with "beautifully scripted set pieces." IGN Voodoo Extreme similarly remarked that it "virtually plays on a rail, but that's part of its charm." In contrast to later entries in the Call of Duty franchise, Ben "Yahtzee" Croshaw of Zero Punctuation gave the game a positive review, praising how it "never sacrifices gameplay for story, or vice versa" and that it featured "less of the smarmy, black-and-white, 'My Country, 'Tis of Thee' jingoism that turns me off most war games".

Nevertheless, the game has also received criticism. Xbox World 360 stated "It's smoke and mirrors and a host of cheap tricks", commenting on the notion that the game did not revolutionize the genre. Pelit also remarked that "the structure of the single player game should ... have been updated" and that "barging from one invisible checkpoint to the next throughout the whole campaign just isn't good enough anymore."

Wii version
Modern Warfare – Reflex Edition was ported by Treyarch. The Wii version of Call of Duty 4: Modern Warfare has fewer features than the other console versions. It does not support split-screen multiplayer, and the graphics are not as developed. However, it supports co-operative gameplay in the campaign on a single screen. At any moment, a second Wii remote can be activated giving the second player their own aiming crosshairs. The game received an aggregated score of 76% on Metacritic. IGN gave the Wii version of the game, Call of Duty: Modern Warfare – Reflex Edition, a score of 7.0, saying the visuals and pointer controls are not as polished as the Wii version of World at War, though they did mention the customization options and multiplayer are impressive. Official Nintendo Magazine gave it 80%, praising it for packing everything from its next-gen counterpart, but again criticizing the visuals. GameTrailers gave the game an 8.8, saying that despite some sacrifices, it retains everything good from its original version. Game Informer scored the game at a 6.5, stating that while the game was rather poor graphically, even by Wii standards, the bigger problem was the Wii remote, stating that it did not have enough buttons to support Modern Warfare control scheme, and also that it was quite imprecise, contrasting it with the dual analog system used by the PlayStation 3 and Xbox 360 versions, and the mouse and keyboard system on the Windows version of the game. GameSpot gave the game an 8.5, stating that the online was as addictive as the other versions, they also said that the controls "are precise and customizable enough to let you be all you can be".

Legacy
Call of Duty 4: Modern Warfare spawned two sequels: Modern Warfare 2 and Modern Warfare 3, which were released in 2009 and 2011, respectively. A remastered version of Modern Warfare, titled Call of Duty: Modern Warfare Remastered, was developed by Raven Software. The remaster was first released as part of several special editions of Call of Duty: Infinite Warfare when that game was released for Microsoft Windows, PlayStation 4 and Xbox One, followed by a standalone release for PlayStation 4 in June 2017, and for Microsoft Windows and Xbox One in July 2017. A reboot of all three Modern Warfare installments, developed by Infinity Ward and simply titled Call of Duty: Modern Warfare, was released in October 2019.

Sales
Before Call of Duty 4: Modern Warfare was released, it was predicted to sell even more copies than the highly successful Halo 3; it had received reviews as high as Halo 3s, it was launching on three systems as opposed to one for Halo 3, and demand for the game led to a wide range of retailers only having enough available to satisfy pre-orders. It fulfilled the prediction and the Xbox 360 version became the best-selling video game in the United States from November 2007 to January 2008 according to the NPD Group. The Xbox 360 and PlayStation 3 versions would go on to sell 1.57 million and 444,000 units, respectively, in the United States in November 2007. 1.47 million units of the Xbox 360 version were sold in December 2007; the game sold 331,000 copies for the Xbox 360 and 140,000 copies for the PlayStation 3 in January 2008. The Xbox 360 version was the third best-selling video game of 2007 in the U.S. with 3.04 million units sold, behind Halo 3, which sold 4.82 million units, according to the NPD Group. By January 2008, Call of Duty 4: Modern Warfare had sold more than 7 million copies worldwide, and was the best-selling game of 2007. On June 3, 2008, Infinity Ward reported that the game had sold over 10 million units. During a May 2009 conference call, Activision announced that the game has sold 13 million copies, surpassing Super Mario Galaxy as the best selling game released that week of November 2007. By November 2013, the game had sold 15.7 million copies.

Call of Duty 4: Modern Warfare was widely distributed online in the form of infringing copies. Robert Bowling, Community Manager at Infinity Ward stated, "We pulled some disturbing numbers this past week about the amount of PC players currently playing Multiplayer... What wasn't fantastic was the percentage of those numbers who were playing on stolen copies of the game on stolen/cracked CD keys of pirated copies."

Awards
Call of Duty 4: Modern Warfare received awards from various gaming sites and publications. Both GameSpot and GameTrailers gave the game the Best Graphics of E3 2007 award, and the Best PlayStation 3 Game of 2007 award, and later ranked it as the third best first-person shooter on its "Top 10 FPS Games Ever!" list. It gained high praise from both video game magazine GamePro and GameSpy, having been named the Best Overall Game of 2007 by the former, and Game of the Year by the latter. Game Critics also named the game "Best Action Game". From other authorities such as IGN and X-play, and the Spike Video Game Awards, the game won awards for areas such as Best Sound Design, Best Shooter of 2007, and Best Military Game. From the Academy of Interactive Arts & Sciences, the game won Console Game of the Year, Action game of the Year, and Overall Game of the Year. From the British Academy Video Games Awards, the game also won Best Gameplay of the Year, Best Story and Character of the Year, and People's Choice Game of the Year. The game was awarded with the Academy of Video Games Awards Game of the Year 2007 Award. In 2010, the readers of PlayStation Official Magazine voted it the 7th greatest PlayStation title ever released.

Notes

References

External links

 
 

4: Modern Warfare
2007 video games
AIAS Game of the Year winners
Abandoned buildings and structures in fiction
Activision games
Aspyr games
First-person shooter multiplayer online games
First-person shooters
Interactive Achievement Award winners
MacOS games
Mass murder in fiction
Multiplayer and single-player video games
Multiplayer online games
Nintendo Wi-Fi Connection games
PlayStation 3 games
Square Enix games
Fiction about suicide
Video game sequels
Video games about the Special Air Service
Video games about the United States Marine Corps
Video games scored by Stephen Barton
Video games set in 1996
Video games set in 2011
Video games set in Azerbaijan
Video games set in England
Video games set in Russia
Video games set in Ukraine
Video games set in the Middle East
Weapons of mass destruction in fiction
Wii Wi-Fi games
Wii Zapper games
Windows games
Xbox 360 games
Golden Joystick Award for Game of the Year winners
BAFTA winners (video games)
Spike Video Game Award winners
Infinity Ward games
D.I.C.E. Award for Action Game of the Year winners
D.I.C.E. Award for Online Game of the Year winners
Video games developed in the United States